Reticulitermes arenincola is a species of subterranean termite native to North America.

References 

Termites
Insects described in 1931